Bethalto Community Unit School District 8 is a unified school district based in the Madison County village of Bethalto, Illinois; the district is on the outskirts of the St. Louis Metro Area. The district is composed of five schools, of which all are located in the village of Bethalto except for one. The district is composed of two primary schools, one intermediate schools, one middle school, and one high school. Students attending the unified school district begin their educations at Bethalto East Primary School which serves grades Pre-Kindergarten through first grade.  Next, students attend Parkside Primary School, which serve students in grades second and third; the principals of each school are, respectively, Rachel Leckrone and Aaron Kilpatrick. Students in grades four and five attend Meadowbrook Intermediate School, which is headed by principal Kim Wilks.  Meadowbrook Intermediate School, falls outside Bethalto city limits in nearby Fort Russell Township. Graduates of the intermediate school register at Wilbur Trimpe Middle School, where under direction of Principal Adam Miller, the students progress from grade six through grade eight. The last leg of pre-collegiate education that students in Bethalto Community Unit School District 8 undertake is at Civic Memorial High School, where the school's principal is Justin Newell. The high school mascot is the Eagle, while the middle school mascot is the Royal.

Civic Memorial High School is home to four clubs (including a student council), There also are teams covering eleven separate sports. Civic Memorial High School also produces a drama program, producing a fall play and spring musical every year.

References

External links
 Bethalto Community Unit School District 8 Home Page

School districts in Illinois
Education in Madison County, Illinois
1951 establishments in Illinois
School districts established in 1951